Wu Meijin (born April 25, 1980 in Ruian, Zhejiang) is a Chinese weightlifter who competed in the Men's 56 kilogram weight class at the 2004 Summer Olympics and won the silver medal, lifting 287.5 kilograms in total. He is the 2002 and 2003 world champion. He is now the executive coach of Li Wenwen, the champion of women's super heavyweight in Tokyo 2020 Olympic Games.

References

1980 births
Living people
Chinese male weightlifters
Olympic silver medalists for China
Olympic weightlifters of China
People from Rui'an
Weightlifters at the 2004 Summer Olympics
Olympic medalists in weightlifting
Asian Games medalists in weightlifting
Weightlifters from Zhejiang
Weightlifters at the 2002 Asian Games
Medalists at the 2004 Summer Olympics
Asian Games gold medalists for China

Medalists at the 2002 Asian Games
Sportspeople from Wenzhou
World Weightlifting Championships medalists
21st-century Chinese people